Magɨyi is a Papuan language of Madang Province, Papua New Guinea.  It was discovered in 2012.

References

Sogeram languages
Languages of Madang Province